Darcy Marquardt (born March 22, 1979) is a Canadian rower.

She graduated from the University of Victoria in 2005 with a major in French, and a minor in Psychology.

She has been on the National Women's Rowing Team for 10 years (2002-2012). In her first year on the team, Darcy won a silver medal in the women's fours event at the 2002 World Championships in Seville, Spain and the following year, a bronze in the eights at the 2003 World Championships and Olympic Qualifier in Milan, Italy.

She placed fourth in the 2004 Summer Olympics, with partner Buffy-Lynne Williams, and she was the 2006 World Champion in the Woman's Pairs with Jane Thornton. She finished in fourth at the 2008 Summer Olympics in the women's eight. She won two more silver medals at world championship level, both in the women's eights, in 2010 and 2011.

Most recently, Darcy won an Olympic silver medal in the Women's Eight at the 2012 Summer Olympics in London.

External links
Darcy Marquardt on Real Champions
 Official Darcy Marquardt Website

1979 births
Living people
Olympic rowers of Canada
Rowers at the 2004 Summer Olympics
Rowers at the 2008 Summer Olympics
Rowers at the 2012 Summer Olympics
Rowers from Vancouver
Canadian people of German descent
Olympic silver medalists for Canada
Olympic medalists in rowing
Canadian female rowers
Medalists at the 2012 Summer Olympics
University of Victoria alumni
World Rowing Championships medalists for Canada
21st-century Canadian women